Khuzami is a surname. Notable people with the surname include: 

Robert Khuzami (born 1956), director of the Division of Enforcement of the U.S. Securities and Exchange Commission and former United States federal prosecutor and general counsel of Deutsche Bank AG
Vicki Khuzami, American illustrator, muralist and set designer